Paul Ford (1901–1976) was an American actor.

Paul Ford may also refer to:
Paul Leicester Ford (1865–1902), American novelist and biographer
Paul Ford, owner of MyToons
Paul Ford (pianist), see Mandy Patinkin Sings Sondheim

See also
Christopher Paul Ford, American actor and martial arts black belt master
Ford (surname)